StAR-related lipid transfer protein 10 (STARD10) or PCTP-like protein is a lipid transfer protein that in humans is encoded by the STARD10 gene.  The protein derives its name from the fact that the molecule contains a START domain.  As part of the StarD2 subfamily, StarD10 can transport the lipids phosphatidylcholine and phosphatidylethanolamine between membranes in solution. Casein kinase II phosphorylates the protein on its serine at position 184.

The function of StarD10 in the cell is not yet understood.  Its expression is associated with cancer, but the nature of its role is unclear.  Most recent data indicate that loss of StarD10 expression in breast cancer is associated with poor outcomes in patients.

References

Further reading